The meridian 163° west of Greenwich is a line of longitude that extends from the North Pole across the Arctic Ocean, North America, the Pacific Ocean, the Southern Ocean, and Antarctica to the South Pole.

The 163rd meridian west forms a great circle with the 17th meridian east.

From Pole to Pole
Starting at the North Pole and heading south to the South Pole, the 163rd meridian west passes through:

{| class="wikitable plainrowheaders"
! scope="col" width="130" | Co-ordinates
! scope="col" | Country, territory or sea
! scope="col" | Notes
|-
| style="background:#b0e0e6;" | 
! scope="row" style="background:#b0e0e6;" | Arctic Ocean
| style="background:#b0e0e6;" |
|-
| style="background:#b0e0e6;" | 
! scope="row" style="background:#b0e0e6;" | Chukchi Sea
| style="background:#b0e0e6;" |
|-
| 
! scope="row" | 
| Alaska
|-
| style="background:#b0e0e6;" | 
! scope="row" style="background:#b0e0e6;" | Chukchi Sea
| style="background:#b0e0e6;" | Kotzebue Sound
|-
| 
! scope="row" | 
| Alaska — Seward Peninsula
|-
| style="background:#b0e0e6;" | 
! scope="row" style="background:#b0e0e6;" | Bering Sea
| style="background:#b0e0e6;" | Norton Sound
|-
| 
! scope="row" | 
| Alaska
|-
| style="background:#b0e0e6;" | 
! scope="row" style="background:#b0e0e6;" | Bering Sea
| style="background:#b0e0e6;" | Passing just east of Amak Island, Alaska,  (at )
|-
| 
! scope="row" | 
| Alaska — Alaska Peninsula
|-valign="top"
| style="background:#b0e0e6;" | 
! scope="row" style="background:#b0e0e6;" | Pacific Ocean
| style="background:#b0e0e6;" | Passing just east of Unimak Island, Alaska,  (at ) Passing just west of Sanak Island, Alaska,  (at ) Passing just east of Suwarrow atoll,  (at ) Passing just east of Palmerston Island,  (at )
|-
| style="background:#b0e0e6;" | 
! scope="row" style="background:#b0e0e6;" | Southern Ocean
| style="background:#b0e0e6;" |
|-
| 
! scope="row" | Antarctica
| Ross Dependency, claimed by 
|-
|}

See also
162nd meridian west
164th meridian west

w163 meridian west